Cropthorne is a  village and civil parish in Worcestershire, England within the Vale of Evesham, and on the North-west edge of the Cotswolds. Cropthorne has a population of 603, in 237 households (2001 census). Located on a small ridge overlooking the River Avon, its ancient orchards sweep down to the river and offer clear, unbroken views across the vale to the Malvern Hills in the distance. It is featured in the Domesday Book, and St Michael's Church dates back to the 12th century. The church is a Grade I listed building. The village has many unique examples of timber-framed thatched cottages from the 16th and 17th centuries, and about half the village is designated as a Conservation area. The village has a Site of Special Scientific Interest, Cropthorne New Inn Section.

Cropthorne has a primary school that serves Cropthorne and the neighbouring village of Charlton. It currently has two pubs The Bell Inn and The New Inn, both offering food and guest accommodation. The village of Fladbury is situated on the opposite bank of the river, and the two communities are linked by the Jubilee Bridge. The Anglican parishes of Fladbury, Hill and Moor and Cropthorne are combined, with a single rector looking after all of the churches. Children from Cropthorne First School, may go on to Bredon Hill Middle School, then Prince Henry's High School in Evesham.

Cropthorne has a large playing field (the Sheppey), with a village hall and children's play area.  Youth activities centre on the Sheppey Junior Sports Club, which has junior football teams from U9 to U13.  An adult football team also plays on the Sheppey.

In the year 2000 Cropthorne won the best kept medium village award.

Cropthorne Floods 2007
In 2007 Cropthorne and the surrounding area were severely  flooded. The B4084 road linking the towns of Evesham and Pershore collapsed and caused major hold-ups throughout the county of Worcestershire. The collapsed road was later called Cropthorne Canyon; the repairs took four months to be repaired at  a cost of around £1 million.

Local amenities and events
The Cropthorne Walkabout is an  annual event that takes place on the Sunday and bank holiday Monday at the beginning of May each year, to coincide with the blossom season. Several of the historic gardens on the banks of the River Avon are opened to the public.
Cropthorne is on the Vale of Evesham Blossom Trail that  takes place during the two weeks in the spring when all the apple, pear, and cherry trees are in bloom.

Cropthorne has its own Holland House (not to be confused with the one in Kensington). Set in  gardens on the edge of the River Avon, the black and white timbered Tudor buildings offer a ‘safe space’ where people are encouraged to feel at home and allowed to get on with what they came to do, whether it is a conference, retreat or training.

Notable residents
 Minnie Holland (d. 1942), local photographer known for her images of Cropthorne.
 Michael Spicer, a former MP for the conservative party.
 Richard Cadbury Barrow and George Corbyn Barrow,  both Lord Mayors of Birmingham: the Cropthorne Mill has been in the Barrow Cadbury family for over 150 years.
 Henry Howard Avery - a member of the family of Victorian Entrepreneurs W&T Avery (makers of a wide variety of weighing machines and scales (Avery Scales) based in Birmingham - see W & T Avery) lived in the village during the late 19th, early 20th centuries. Avery lived in a large black & white timber-framed house known as "The Den", now known as "Holland House" - currently a Christian Retreat Centre (www.hollandhouse.org). Avery built an extension to the original 16th century building and had the architect carve "HH AVERY 1904" on an external lintel which can easily be seen from the garden. He also re-designed the garden and grounds which contain an impressive "sunken garden" attributed to Sir Edwin Lutyens (see Butlers "The Architecture of Sir William Lutyens" 1900 - note "Garden at the Den, Pershore for Mr H Avery") Avery Scales are now part of Avery-Berkel who manufacture the scales UK Post Offices use to weigh letters and post, and Averyweigh-tronix.
 Sir William Lawson Tate, an eminent surgeon and pioneer of abdominal surgery lived in the village, also in "The Den" in the later part of the 19th Century. His residence was also "The Den", which he eventually sold to Henry Howard Avery for around £500.  Sir Lawson Tait was an extraordinary man (see the Wikipedia link below).
Lawson Tait, born Robert Lawson Tait (1 May 1845 – 13 June 1899) was a pioneer in pelvic and abdominal surgery and developed new techniques and procedures. He emphasized asepsis and introduced and advocated for surgical techniques that significantly reduced mortality. He is well known for introducing salpingectomy in 1883 as the treatment for ectopic pregnancy, a procedure that has saved countless lives since then. Tait and J. Marion Sims are considered the fathers of gynecology (see Lawson Tait)

References

External links

Historical Book of Cropthorne Mill, Fladbury and Modern Day Images
Village website
Cropthorne Walkabout website
Holland House,Cropthorne website
Cropthorne Autonomous House,Cropthorne website
Details of Cropthorne SSSI
 Village Hall Website 
Parish Council Website

Villages in Worcestershire
Civil parishes in Worcestershire